The Dundee by-election was a Parliamentary by-election held on 9 May 1908. The constituency returned two Members of Parliament (MP) to the House of Commons of the United Kingdom, elected by the first past the post voting system.

Vacancy
The Liberal MP Edmund Robertson was elevated to the peerage as 1st Baron Lochee.

Electoral history

Candidates
Thirty-four-year-old Winston Churchill was selected by the local Liberal Association to be their candidate. Churchill had been elected Liberal MP for Manchester North West at the 1906 general election but had lost his seat at the 1908 Manchester North West by-election on 24 April. Churchill had been appointed to the Cabinet by H. H. Asquith as President of the Board of Trade. Under the law at the time, a newly appointed Cabinet Minister was obliged to seek re-election at a by-election; hence, he sought an opportunity to return to parliament.

Sir George Baxter, a 55-year-old local man, was chosen by the Unionists in Dundee. He was a linen and jute manufacturer, and had been Chairman of Dundee and District Liberal Unionist Association ever since its creation in 1886. He had contested Montrose Burghs in 1895. Baxter was the son of the former Liberal MP for Montrose Burghs, William Edward Baxter, and a great-nephew of the philanthropists Sir David Baxter and Mary Ann Baxter.

The local Labour Party selected 38-year-old G. H. Stuart as their candidate. He was born in Oldham, and became a postman and an activist in the Postmen's Federation. He also became active in the Labour Party, and stood unsuccessfully in York at the 1906 general election, His candidature was endorsed by the Scottish section of the party, but the National Executive refused to back him, as the party already held the other Dundee seat, and was concerned that it would over-reach itself.

Forty-two-year-old Edwin Scrymgeour stood as a Scottish Prohibition Party candidate. He was a native of Dundee and a pioneer of the Scottish temperance movement, and established his party in 1901 to further this aim. He had previously been a member of the Independent Labour Party. He was elected to Dundee Town Council in 1905. He had not previously stood for parliament.

Campaign

The issue of free trade v protectionism featured prominently in the campaign. This was because the jute industry was significant in Dundee, and it relied on importing raw jute, mainly from India. The Unionist, Sir George Baxter, stood on a protectionist platform, focusing his protectionist demands on Germany rather than India. However, James Caird, a prominent local jute proprietor, actively supported the free-trader Churchill by funding his pro-free trade propaganda.

On 14 May (after the poll), Churchill gave a significant speech at Kinnaird Hall [see external links, below].

Despite Stuart not being officially endorsed by the Labour Party, the party leader, Keir Hardie, sent him a letter of support in which condemned Churchill for "shameless prevarication" over the Right to Work Bill. He also spoke on Stuart's platform, and the Dundee Courier enthusiastically reported his criticisms of the Liberal Party candidate, Winston Churchill. Stuart was criticised for speaking too little about socialism and for not holding membership of the Independent Labour Party.

Scrymgeour described himself as a "Prohibition and Labour" candidate. As a strict Wesleyan, he urged electors to "vote how you pray".

The Women's Social and Political Union was active in the campaign, with Mary Gawthorpe, Emmeline Pankhurst and Christabel Pankhurst holding meetings in the town. However, they were upstaged by the non-violent Women's Freedom League member Mary Maloney who came up from London for the campaign. Whenever Churchill spoke, Maloney produced a swinging dinner bell which drowned out what he was saying. The ding-dong exchanges were taken in fun initially, but some meetings had to be cancelled because of the uproar.

Result

Aftermath

Churchill continued to represent Dundee until 1922. Baxter re-appeared as candidate here at the December 1910 general election, his last electoral contest. Stuart made one further unsuccessful attempt to enter parliament, otherwise he concentrated on his Trade Union career. Scrymgeour continued to contest elections in Dundee and was eventually elected here in 1922.

See also
1917 Dundee by-election
1924 Dundee by-election

External links
Churchill's Kinnaird Hall speech: https://books.google.com/books?id=vBHrEAuKNV4C&pg=PA73&dq=Dundee+by-election,+1908&hl=en&sa=X&ei=1V8PUvCHCtT30gXjg4CgCw&ved=0CDkQ6AEwAQ#v=onepage&q=Dundee%20by-election%2C%201908&f=false

References

Dundee
By-elections to the Parliament of the United Kingdom in Scottish constituencies
By-elections to the Parliament of the United Kingdom in Dundee constituencies
Dundee by-election
Dundee by-election
1900s elections in Scotland
Dundee by-election
20th century in Dundee
History of Dundee